Jaime Alguersuari Tortajada (also known as Jaime Alguersuari Sr., born April 2, 1950, in Barcelona, Spain), is a Spanish former Grand Prix motorcycle racer. He is the father of Ex-Formula One driver Jaime Alguersuari.

He won the 250 cc category at the 1972 Bol d'Or at Le Mans on a Montesa.

In 1975, he and his brother José Maria founded the Solo Moto magazine. Through his companies Alesport and RPM, he invented indoor trial and endurocross with events at the Palau Sant Jordi in Barcelona. In addition to motorcycling events, RPM has organized the World Series by Renault, the Barcelona Marathon, the Spanish stages of the Rally Dakar, and the Superprestigio Dirt Track.

Motorcycle Grand Prix results

(key) (Races in bold indicate pole position; races in italics indicate fastest lap)

References

External links 
 
 José María Alguersuari Biography
 Racer article

1950 births
Living people
Spanish motorcycle racers
Motorcycle racers from Catalonia
Sportspeople from Barcelona
50cc World Championship riders